Club Deportivo Fundación Cultural La Calzada is a Spanish football team located in Santo Domingo de la Calzada, autonomous community of La Rioja. Founded in 1949 it currently plays in Tercera División – Group 16, holding home matches at El Rollo with a capacity of 1,500 spectators.

History 
The club was founded in 1949.

Season to season

9 seasons in Tercera División

References 

Football clubs in La Rioja (Spain)
Association football clubs established in 1949
1949 establishments in Spain